Lynnside Historic District is a national historic district located near Sweet Springs, Monroe County, West Virginia.  The district includes six contributing buildings, three contributing sites, and two contributing structures. It consists of three contiguous properties related to the Lewis family home, known as "Lynnside."  The main house was built in 1845 on the site of a previous plantation house, and is a -story, rectangular masonry dwelling in the Greek Revival style.  It measures 70 feet by 40 feet.  A fire in 1933, destroyed the roof and porticos.  Also on the property are four wooden barns dated to about 1900.  Located nearby is the Lewis Family Cemetery, that includes the grave of Virginia Governor John Floyd (1783-1837), and the adjacent Catholic Cemetery dated to 1882.  The district also includes St. John's Catholic Chapel (1853-1859), a simple masonry Greek Revival style building, and the adjacent "New Cemetery."

It was listed on the National Register of Historic Places in 1991.

References

External links

Houses on the National Register of Historic Places in West Virginia
Historic districts on the National Register of Historic Places in West Virginia
Greek Revival architecture in West Virginia
Houses completed in 1845
Houses in Monroe County, West Virginia
Historic American Buildings Survey in West Virginia
National Register of Historic Places in Monroe County, West Virginia
Historic districts in Monroe County, West Virginia
Plantation houses in West Virginia